Narendrapuram is a locality in Rajamahendravaram City. It is located in Rajanagaram mandal of Rajahmundry revenue division. The locality also forms a part of Godavari Urban Development Authority.

References

Villages in East Godavari district